Protein arginine methyltransferase 7 is a protein that in humans is encoded by the PRMT7 gene. Arginine methylation is an apparently irreversible protein modification catalyzed by arginine methyltransferases, such as PMT7, using S-adenosylmethionine (AdoMet) as the methyl donor. Arginine methylation is implicated in signal transduction, RNA transport, and RNA splicing.

Model organisms

Model organisms have been used in the study of PRMT7 function. A conditional knockout mouse line, called Prmt7tm1a(EUCOMM)Wtsi was generated as part of the International Knockout Mouse Consortium program — a high-throughput mutagenesis project to generate and distribute animal models of disease to interested scientists.

Male and female animals underwent a standardized phenotypic screen to determine the effects of deletion. Twenty five tests were carried out on mutant mice and two significant abnormalities were observed. Fewer than expected homozygous mutant mice survived until weaning and those that did survive displayed evidence of chromosomal instability in a micronucleus test.

References

Further reading 
 

Human proteins
Genes mutated in mice